{{Infobox sportsperson
| name           = Aleksandar Bundalo
| image          =
| image_size     =
| caption        =
| birth_date     = 
| birth_place    = Sremska Mitrovica, SR Serbia, SFR Yugoslavia
| height         = 2.05 m (6' 9)
| weight         = 109 kg / 240 lbs
| headercolor    = 
| country        = 
| sport          = Bobsleigh, Athletics
}}

Aleksandar Bundalo (born 28 September 1989) is a bobsledder and politician from Serbia. He competed for Serbia at the 2014 Winter Olympics in the two man event with Vuk Rađenović. Bundalo is also a track and field athlete, and has been a national champion in the long jump and triple jump.

Personal bests (outdoor)

Politician
Bundalo is a member of the Serbian Progressive Party. He was appointed to the municipal council of Ruma on 10 June 2016 with responsibility for sports and served in this role for the four years."КОНФЕРЕНЦИЈА ЗА МЕДИЈЕ О УЛАГАЊИМА У СПОРТ И СПОРТСКУ ИНФРАСТРУКТУРУ", Serbian Progressive Party – Ruma, 5 July 2019, accessed 30 January 2021. 

He was given the twelfth position on the Progressive Party's Aleksandar Vučić — For Our Children'' electoral list in the 2020 Vojvodina provincial election and was elected when the list won a majority victory with seventy-six out of 120 mandates. He is now a member of the assembly committee on agriculture and the committee on youth and sports.

References

External links
 
 
 
 
 

1989 births
Living people
Olympic bobsledders of Serbia
Bobsledders at the 2014 Winter Olympics
Serbian male long jumpers
Serbian male triple jumpers
Serbian male bobsledders
Sportspeople from Sremska Mitrovica
People from Ruma
Members of the Assembly of Vojvodina
Serbian Progressive Party politicians